Everest Premier League (EPL) is a franchise Twenty20 cricket tournament organized by EPL Pvt. Ltd., a private group in Nepal. It is the biggest cricket tournament in the country, played during the northern winter calendar, mostly in the month of December. It is played in round-robin format in which top four teams qualify for the playoffs. The tournament is renowned for having high attendance among the domestic cricket of the ICC associate nations. The first edition of the tournament was held in September 2016 with six franchises consisting of domestic and international players. Chitwan Tigers are the defending champions after winning the 2021 season.

History

Everest Premier League was unveiled on 24 February 2014 in a press conference held at Hotel Radisson. Zohra Sports Management and Cricket Association of Nepal had an exclusive agreement to introduce NPL for an initial three years.

On 13 May 2014 a handful of CAN members issued a press release claiming CAN had pulled out as the organizers of the tournament. In 2016, EPL was announced from September 24 to October 3 in TU Cricket Ground. While a majority of CAN members resigned from NPL Governing Council, the then President, Tanka Angbuhang still continued to promote the event stating that the decision made was unofficial and without his knowledge. The sponsor for 2014 was C.G. Foods (Wai Wai).

Teams

Current teams 

Each team consisted of 15 players. Among them 10 players were bought by each team through auction. A talent hunt was conducted by each team in their respective cities to acquire a young player in their squad. Similarly, the teams also included at least three foreign players in their side.

Former teams 
In the 2016 edition, the teams in the tournament were based on corporate sectors.

Tournament seasons and results

EPL overall season results
All season's results are in a table.

Team's performance

Broadcasting

Kantipur Gold (2016)
 Eurosport (2019–2021) 
AP1 Television (2017–2019)
1Sports (2020–present)
Himalaya TV (2021–present)   
1sports (2022- present)

See also 
 Dhangadhi Premier League
 Pokhara Premier League

References

External links 

 
Nepalese domestic cricket competitions
Recurring sporting events established in 2014
Sports leagues established in 2014
Twenty20 cricket leagues
2014 establishments in Nepal